The 2023 Pacific typhoon season is an ongoing event in the annual cycle of tropical cyclone formation, in which tropical cyclones form in the western Pacific Ocean. The season runs throughout 2023, though most tropical cyclones typically develop between May and October.

The scope of this article is limited to the Pacific Ocean to the north of the equator between 100°E and 180th meridian. Within the northwestern Pacific Ocean, there are two separate agencies that assign names to tropical cyclones which can often result in a cyclone having two names. The Japan Meteorological Agency (JMA) will name a tropical cyclone should it be judged to have 10-minute sustained wind speeds of at least  anywhere in the basin, whilst the Philippine Atmospheric, Geophysical and Astronomical Services Administration (PAGASA) assigns names to tropical cyclones which move into or form as a tropical depression in the Philippine Area of Responsibility (PAR) located between 135°E and 115°E and between 5°N–25°N regardless of whether or not a tropical cyclone has already been given a name by the JMA. Tropical depressions that are monitored by the United States' Joint Typhoon Warning Center (JTWC) are given a number with a "W" suffix.  


Seasonal summary 
A tropical depression, being the first system of the season, formed to the east of Singapore and killed at least four people.

Systems

Other system 

According to the JMA, a tropical depression formed to the east of Singapore on March 4. It was designated 98S by the JTWC shortly afterwards, due to the agency analyzing the system as being located within the Southern Hemisphere. The system was last noted on March 7. 50,000 people were affected in Malaysia from the floods produced by the system, which also killed four people.

Storm names 

Within the Northwest Pacific Ocean, both the Japan Meteorological Agency (JMA) and the Philippine Atmospheric, Geophysical and Astronomical Services Administration (PAGASA) assign names to tropical cyclones that develop in the Western Pacific, which can result in a tropical cyclone having two names. PAGASA names to tropical cyclones which move into or form as a tropical depression in their area of responsibility located between 135°E and 115°E and between 5°N and 25°N even if the cyclone has had an international name assigned to it. The names of significant tropical cyclones are retired, by both PAGASA and the Typhoon Committee. Should the list of names for the Philippine region be exhausted then names will be taken from an auxiliary list of which the first ten are published each season.

International names

The JMA selected the names from a list of 140 names, that had been developed by the 14 members nations and territories of the ESCAP/WMO Typhoon Committee. Retired names, if any, will be announced by the WMO in 2024; though replacement names will be announced in 2025. The next 28 names on the naming list are listed here along with their international numeric designation, if they are used.

Philippines

This season, PAGASA will use its own naming scheme, that will either develop within or move into their self-defined area of responsibility. The names were taken from a list of names, that was last used during 2019 and are scheduled to be used again during 2027. All of the names are the same except Tamaraw and Ugong, which replaced the names Tisoy and Ursula after they were retired.

Auxiliary list

Season effects 
This table summarizes all the systems that developed within or moved into the North Pacific Ocean, to the west of the International Date Line during 2023. The tables also provide an overview of a system's intensity, duration, land areas affected, and any deaths or damages associated with the system.

|-
| TD ||  || bgcolor=#| || bgcolor=#|  || bgcolor=#||| Greater Indonesia ||  Unknown ||  4 || 
|-

See also 

 Weather of 2023
 Tropical cyclones in 2023
 Pacific typhoon season
 2023 Atlantic hurricane season
 2023 Pacific hurricane season
 2023 North Indian Ocean cyclone season
 South-West Indian Ocean cyclone seasons: 2022–23, 2023–24
 Australian region cyclone seasons: 2022–23, 2023–24
 South Pacific cyclone seasons: 2022–23, 2023–24

Notes

References

External links

Articles which contain graphical timelines
Pacific typhoon seasons
Tropical cyclones in 2023